The Federation of Social Protection, Work and Employment (PSTE) is a trade union representing civil servants in departments relating to social services and employment.

The union was founded when the Federation of Labour Ministry Employees merged with the Federation of Social Security.  Like its predecessors, it affiliated to the French Democratic Confederation of Labour.  By 1995, the union claimed 16,000 members.

External links

References

Civil service trade unions
Trade unions in France